Alessandro Lucciola Molon (Belo Horizonte, October 28, 1971) is a Brazilian teacher and politician, member of the Brazilian Socialist Party (PSB) and former Leader of the Opposition in the Chamber of Deputies. He was the rapporteur to Brazil's Bill of Rights for the Internet (Marco Civil da Internet), ensuring net neutrality, privacy protection and freedom of expression online.

Biography 
Alessandro Molon was born in Belo Horizonte, Minas Gerais, but was raised in Rio de Janeiro, where he lives.

He holds a Bachelor's and a master's degree in History from Universidade Federal Fluminense (UFF) and a bachelor's degree in Law from the Pontifical Catholic University of Rio de Janeiro (PUC-Rio). He is currently concluding his Doctorate at Universidade Estadual do Rio de Janeiro (UERJ).

Alessandro Molon has also taught in public and private schools in Rio de Janeiro, before beginning his political career. He currently teaches Law students at PUC-Rio.

Political career 
After experiencing the tough educational scenario in Brazil as a teacher, Alessandro Molon decided to pursue a political career in order to make more impactful changes, with a focus on combating the country's abyssal inequalities. In 2002, he was elected for his first term as state deputy in the Legislative Assembly of the Rio de Janeiro State (Alerj), being reelected in 2006. In this period, he was president of Alerj's Human Rights Commission and Culture Commission, and was known for his opposition to controversial political figures such as Jorge Picciani and Sérgio Cabral, who are now in prison.

In 2010, Alessandro Molon was elected federal deputy in the Brazilian Chamber of Deputies. In his first term, he reported and approved the Marco Civil da Internet (Free Internet Law). He also managed to update the Brazilian Constitution to guarantee access to justice for all, through the Public Defender's Office amendment.

In 2014, Alessandro Molon was reelected for his second term as federal deputy. Molon was the main articulator of the process that dismissed the former deputy and President of the Chamber of Deputies, Eduardo Cunha, who was later charged with corruption and imprisoned. Alessandro Molon was also a strong voice against president Michel Temer's government. In his second term, Molon became known for his work in defense of climate protection as President of the Environment Parliamentary Group.  

In 2018, Alessandro Molon was reelected federal deputy for a third term, with t he third largest number of votes in the State of Rio de Janeiro. In 2019, he was appointed Leader of the Opposition to president Jair Bolsonaro’s government. Molon also articulated and ensured the approval of a project of his authorship that removes firearms of those who commit violence against women.

Alessandro Molon ran for Mayor of Rio de Janeiro in 2008 and 2016.

References

|-

|-

|-

|-

1971 births
Members of the Chamber of Deputies (Brazil) from Rio de Janeiro (state)
Living people
Sustainability Network politicians
Members of the Legislative Assembly of Rio de Janeiro
Fluminense Federal University alumni
Pontifical Catholic University of Rio de Janeiro alumni
People from Belo Horizonte
Brazilian educators